Monbeig is a surname. Notable people with the surname include:

Pierre Monbeig (1908–1987), French geographer
Théodore Monbeig (1875–1914), French Catholic missionary and botanist